Al-Mustafa International University (MIU) (Jam'h-e Almistâfi-ye Al'alâmih) is an international academic, Islamic and university-style seminary institute in Qom, Iran established in 1979. It has international branches and affiliate schools.

The university has provided Islamic education to international students (including female scholars) mostly at a graduate level, in a combined seminary and academic format focused on the study of the Comparative Religion, Quran, Hadith, Islamic Jurisprudence, Islamic Philosophy and Discourse, Islamic Mysticism, Economics, Political Science, Psychology, Sociology, Education, Management, Persian Language and Literature, Arabic. It also provides associate degree for French, Korean, Chinese, English, Japanese, Spanish and Russian.

It also provides Sunni Islam and Shia Islam seminary courses in English, Arabic and Persian.

Membership in international organizations
Besides participation in international scientific-cultural forum, Al-Mustafa University is a member of the following international scientific forums and organizations:
 Federation of the Universities of the Islamic World (FUIW)
 International Association of Universities (IAU)
 International Association of University Presidents (IAUP)
 Association of Universities of Asia and the Pacific (AUAP)
 Union of Islamic World Students (Rohama)

History

The university was founded in 1979. The university is headquartered in Tehran but has branches in several other Iranian cities. 

On December 8, 2020, United States Department of the Treasury (under Steven Mnuchin) sanctioned the university for allegedly recruiting students to fight in Syria .  The university published a response.

Presidents
 Ali Abbasi (through 2020-2021)
 Alireza Arafi former president of Al-Mustafa International University (MIU)

Graduates

 Nour Tessie Jørgensen
 Imran Raza Ansari

See also 
Ali Reza Tavassoli
Pattern-making policy of the Islamic Republic

References

Al-Mustafa International University
Buildings and structures in Qom
Education in Qom Province
Islamic seminaries and theological colleges
Foreign policy strategies in the Islamic Republic of Iran
Iranian entities subject to the U.S. Department of the Treasury sanctions